During the 1996–97 English football season, Middlesbrough competed in the Premier League (known as the FA Carling Premiership for sponsorship reasons). Despite reaching the finals of both domestic cup competitions, Middlesbrough were relegated from the Premier League in 19th place (although this came after a points deduction for postponing a fixture against Blackburn Rovers).

Season summary
The multi-million pound signings of Brazilian midfielder Emerson and Italian striker Fabrizio Ravanelli suggested that Middlesbrough could compete with the very best after finishing 12th the previous season, but ahead lay quite a unique season which ultimately ended in disappointment; though, on the goalscoring front, Middlesbrough's games were undeniably entertaining to watch, as in total, 111 goals were witnessed, the fourth highest total of goals for and against within Premier League clubs' matches. The season though started brightly with a thrilling 3–3 draw against Liverpool with Ravanelli scoring a hat-trick on his debut. The next two home games were impressively won: 4–1 against West Ham United and 4–0 against Coventry City (with Ravanelli and Juninho scoring two goals each in that match). Their season's first away win at Everton saw them rise as high as fourth in the table; however, beginning from their 2–0 home defeat to title challengers Arsenal, they were not to win another match in 12 attempts until Boxing Day, winning the return fixture against the Toffees 4–2.

By Christmas, Middlesbrough were deep in relegation trouble, despite Ravanelli proving himself as one of the league's top goalscorers. Added to this, Middlesbrough were faced with the wrath of the Football Association for postponing a fixture against Blackburn Rovers at short notice. The club's officials insisted that manager Bryan Robson had been unable to field a team due to a severe injury and illness crisis among his players, but this did not prevent the Football Association from docking the club 3 points.

Middlesbrough managed to put together a good run of results and look like decent bets for survival, but the Football Association's refusal to restore Middlesbrough's 3 points counted against them and a 1–1 draw at Leeds United on the final day of the season, when they needed a win, resulted in relegation that would have been avoided (at the expense of Coventry City) if the points had not been deducted.

Middlesbrough also hit the headlines with two brilliant cup runs. As a club who had never won a major trophy or even reached a domestic cup final before, history was made in February when Middlesbrough reached the League Cup final. They drew 1–1 with Leicester City at Wembley in the first match, but lost the replay 1–0 at Hillsborough. Two months later, they took on Chelsea in the FA Cup final, but lost 2–0. Therefore, they became the first team to finish in the last two of both major cup competitions whilst also being relegated - surpassing Crystal Palace's distinction (attained in 1995) of finishing in the last four of both major cup competitions while being relegated in the league.

Final league table

Results summary

Results by round

Results
Middlesbrough's score comes first

Legend

FA Premier League

FA Cup

League Cup

First-team squad
Squad at end of season

Left club during season

Reserve squad

Appearances and goals

|-
! colspan=14 style=background:#dcdcdc; text-align:center| Goalkeepers

|-
! colspan=14 style=background:#dcdcdc; text-align:center| Defenders

|-
! colspan=14 style=background:#dcdcdc; text-align:center| Midfielders

|-
! colspan=14 style=background:#dcdcdc; text-align:center| Forwards

|-
! colspan=14 style=background:#dcdcdc; text-align:center| Players transferred out during the season

References

Middlesbrough F.C. seasons
Middlesbrough